Han Wan (韓萬), also known as Wuzi of Han (Chinese: 韓武子; pinyin: Hán Wǔzǐ), ancestral name Jì (姬), clan name Hán (韓), personal name Wàn (萬), and posthumously known as Wuzi of Han, was the head of the House of Han. He was the son of Huan Shu of Quwo, half-brother of Zhuang Bo of Quwo, and the progenitor of Warring States period's State of Han.

Han Wan was a charioteer for his nephew Duke Wu of Quwo and helped to kill Marquess Ai of Jin. Duke Wu of Quwo then took over the throne of Jin as Duke Wu of Jin, who then bestowed Han Wan the land of Han. Han Wan's descendants later adopted Han as the clan name.

Han Wan's descendants became high-ranking officials in Jin. The family became very powerful and eventually led to the Partition of Jin.

Ancestors

References

Shiji Chapter 45
Zizhi Tongjian Volume 1

Zhou dynasty nobility
Monarchs of Han (state)